Astragalus rattanii is a species of milkvetch known by the common name Rattan's milkvetch. It is endemic to northern California, where it grows in the North Coast Ranges.

Description
The leaves are a few centimeters long and made up of a few oval-shaped leaflets. The inflorescence is a head of two to ten flowers which are pinkish purple in color with paler tips.

External links
Jepson Manual Treatment
USDA Plants Profile
Photo gallery

rattanii
Endemic flora of California
Flora without expected TNC conservation status